Pseudocoladenia dan, commonly known as the fulvous pied flat, is an Indomalayan species of butterfly in the family Hesperiidae. It is found from India to southeast Asia.

Description

Subspecies
 P. d. dan (Fabricius, 1787) - India
 P. d. fatih (Kollar, [1844]) - Kashmir
 P. d. fabia (Evans, 1949) - Assam, Bhutan, Sikkim, Myanmar, Thailand, Indo-China, South China (Anhui, Fujian, Guangdong, Guangxi, Hainan, Yunnan)
 P. d. dhyana (Fruhstorfer, 1909) - Myanmar, Thailand, Malay Peninsula
 P. d. sumatrana  (Fruhstorfer, 1909) - West Sumatra
 P. d. fulvescens (Elwes & Edwards, 1897)
 P. d. eacus (Latreille, [1824]) - Java, Lesser Sunda Islands , Sulawesi
 P. d. sadakoe (Sonan & Miltono, 1936) - Taiwan

Biology
The larva feeds on Achyranthes aspera.

References

Celaenorrhinini
Butterflies of Singapore
Butterflies of Indochina
Butterflies described in 1787